Distrito Grafiti is a station that is part of the TransMilenio mass-transit system of Bogotá, Colombia, which opened in the year 2003.

Location

The station is located in the industrial zone of Bogotá, specifically on Avenida de Las Américas with Carrera 53 A.

It serves the Salazar Gómez, San Rafael, and Puente Aranda neighborhoods.

History
In 2003, the Las Américas line was extended from this station to Transversal 86.

The station was named Américas - Carrera 53 A due to its location at that intersection. Its name changed in November, 2019, to Distrito Grafiti.

Station Services

Old trunk services

Main line service

Feeder routes

This station does not have connections to feeder routes.

Inter-city service

This station does not have inter-city service.

See also
Bogotá
TransMilenio
List of TransMilenio stations

References

External links

TransMilenio

TransMilenio